Ranchers-Cattlemen Action Legal Fund v. USDA (No. 2:17-cv-00223) is a challenge to USDA rules that allow Mexican and Canadian beef to be labelled as domestic beef.   

This case is distinguished from Ranchers-Cattlemen Action Legal Fund v. Sonny Perdue (No. 4:16-cv-00041-BMM) in which plaintiffs allege that checkoff dollars are being used to support Canadian and Mexican beef.

Facts and prior history
In 2016 the United States Department of Agriculture rescinded regulations requiring Mexican and Canadian beef be marked as imported. Plaintiffs filed the complaint May 19, 2017.

In March 2018, plaintiffs asked for a summary judgement in their favor.

Developments 

 First Amendment Challenge to Beef Checkoff Program Dismissed On March 27, 2020

 Serial Legal Challenges to Federal Beef Checkoff Program Continue on September 11, 2020

 Federal Appeals Court Upholds Dismissal of R-CALF Beef Checkoff Challenge On July 27, 2021

References

Commodity checkoff programs